Wendee Lee is an American voice actress, writer, and director.

Biography
Lee studied dance and theater and later became a full-time dancer in her teens. According to her interview on the Magic Knight Rayearth DVDs, she started doing voices at school and got in trouble for it. Her first anime voice role was in Harmony Gold production Robotech in the 1980s, where she voiced Vanessa Leeds, one of the operators aboard the SDF-1 Macross. She also worked with Streamline on several anime productions including Dragon Ball. She would continue dance and work part-time as a make-up artist, choreography and dance instruction.

Career 
Lee's major voice roles in anime include Kei in the Pioneer dub of Akira, Faye Valentine on Cowboy Bebop, Myōjin Yahiko in Rurouni Kenshin, Takeru "T.K." Takaishi on Digimon Adventure, Haruhi Suzumiya on The Melancholy of Haruhi Suzumiya and Konata Izumi on Lucky Star. She has also worked as an ADR director on Bleach, Love Hina and Outlaw Star and a casting director on The Night B4 Christmas. In 2014-2015, she voiced Queen Serenity in the Viz Media re-dub of the classic Sailor Moon series and the new Sailor Moon Crystal series.

Filmography

Anime

Animation
{| class="wikitable sortable plainrowheaders" style="width=95%; font-size: 95%;"
|+ List of voice performances in animation
|-
! style="background:#b0c4de;" | Year 
! style="background:#b0c4de;"| Series
! style="background:#b0c4de;"| Role 
! style="background:#b0c4de;" class="unsortable"| Notes 
! style="background:#b0c4de;" class="unsortable"| Source
|-
| -present || Family Guy || Various || ||
|-
| –90 || Wisdom of the Gnomes || Bruna ||   || 
|-
| –05 || Megas XLR || Kiva Andru, others ||   || 
|-
|  || Superman: Red Son || Wonder Woman || Motion comic || 
|-
|  || Ever After High || Lizzie Hearts || Netflix seriesEp. "Spring Unsprung || 
|-
|  || Popples || Sunny
|-
|rowspan="2"|  || High Guardian Spice || Angie ||   || 
|-
| Heaven Official's Blessing || Ling Wen || Chinese donghuaEnglish dub || 
|-
|}

Feature films

Direct-to-video and television films

Live-action

Video games

 Documentaries 

Discography

Singles
 God Knows - 
 lost my music'' -

Notes

References

Further reading
 
 
 Wendee Lee interview on Anime Herald
 Wendee Lee interview on Gamasutra
 Wendee Lee interview Gamasutra

External links
  

 
 Wendee Lee at Crystal Acids
 

Living people
American casting directors
Women casting directors
American film actresses
American television actresses
American television directors
American television writers
American video game actresses
American voice actresses
American voice directors
American women screenwriters
American women television directors
American women television writers
20th-century American actresses
21st-century American actresses
Year of birth missing (living people)